The Barishal Express was a railway train that was one of three train services running between India and Bangladesh (then East Pakistan).

History 
The Barishal  Express launched in 1884. The train connected the Indian city of Kolkata (then Calcutta) with the city of Khulna in Bangladesh. The railway link was suspended at the outbreak of the Indo-Pakistani War of 1965. In 1972, the route reopened for 2 years for goods train service.

An agreement was signed between India and Bangladesh in July 2000 to re-establish the train link. Feasibility studies had been going on since 1994. The Bandhan Express is a new train recreating this route in the 21st century. The immigration checks have been moved to Calcutta train station to avoid losing hours waiting at the border.

See also
 Bandhan Express
 Transport between India and Bangladesh#Rail links

References

Benapole
Petrapole
International named passenger trains
Named passenger trains of Bangladesh
Named passenger trains of India
Railway services discontinued in 1965
Transport in Kolkata
Defunct trains in India
Transport in Khulna